Susan Avingaq is an Inuk Canadian film director, producer, screenwriter, and actress. A founding partner in Arnait Video Productions, a women's filmmaking collective based in Igloolik, Nunavut, she is most noted for her work on the film Before Tomorrow (Le jour avant le lendemain), for which she received Genie Award nominations for Best Adapted Screenplay, Best Art Direction/Production Design and Best Original Song ("Pamani") at the 30th Genie Awards in 2010.

She was also credited as a producer of the films Uvanga and Tia and Piujuq, a costume designer for The Journals of Knud Rasmussen and Searchers, an art director on Uvanga and Searchers, and co-director of the documentary films Anaana and Sol.

She has published two children's books, Fishing with Grandma (2015) and The Pencil (2018), in collaboration with Maren Vsetula and illustrator Charlene Chua, and has performed as a storyteller on the children's television series Anaana's Tent and in Laakkuluk Williamson Bathory's theatrical show Kiviuq Returns.

References

External links

21st-century Canadian screenwriters
21st-century Canadian women writers
Canadian documentary film directors
Canadian documentary film producers
Canadian women film directors
Canadian women film producers
Canadian women screenwriters
Canadian children's writers
Canadian costume designers
Canadian production designers
Canadian women songwriters
Canadian storytellers
Women storytellers
Inuit filmmakers
Inuit musicians
Inuit writers
Inuit women
Indigenous fashion designers of the Americas
Artists from Nunavut
Film directors from Nunavut
Writers from Nunavut
Year of birth missing (living people)
Living people
Canadian women fashion designers
Canadian women documentary filmmakers
Film producers from Nunavut